Black Marsh may refer to:
 a region near the Hoarstones in Shropshire, England
 an area of North Point State Park, Maryland, United States
 a fictional province in The Elder Scrolls series

See also 
 
 Black Bog
 Black Swamp
 Black Moor (disambiguation)